Sven Nikola Stojanović (Serbian Cyrillic: Свен Никола Стојановић) (born 14 November 1969) is a Swedish director of Serb descent mostly involved with Swedish TV productions, notably Melodifestivalen.

Stojanović directed and produced Melodifestivalen 2008, Melodifestivalen 2009 and Melodifestivalen 2010 and also worked as director of the Melodifestivalen 2003, Melodifestivalen 2004, Melodifestivalen 2005, Melodifestivalen 2006, Melodifestivalen 2007 and Eurovision Song Contest 2016 held in Stockholm, Sweden. He has previously directed the Eurovision Song Contest in 2003, 2004, 2005, 2008 and 2013, and also co-produced with Marius Bratten the ESC 2000 when it was held in Stockholm.
 
He has directed Swedish shows like Fotbollsgalan, Grammis, Guldbagge Awards, and Idrottsgalan (athletic awards), as well as the first ever live HDTV production in Sweden in 2006.

External links
Webb-tv: Sven is the director of the Eurovision Song Contest (Gyllene Skor, English)
Intervju: Sven Stojanović - interview (Eurovision Serbia, Serbian)

Swedish film directors
Swedish people of Serbian descent
1969 births
Living people
People from Örebro